ViaSat-1 is a high throughput communications satellite owned by  Viasat Inc. and Telesat Canada. Launched October 19, 2011 aboard a Proton rocket, it held the Guinness record for the world's highest capacity communications satellite with a total capacity in excess of 140 Gbit/s, more than all the satellites covering North America combined, at the time of its launch.

ViaSat-1 is capable of two-way communications with small dish antennas at higher speeds and a lower cost-per-bit than any satellite before.

The satellite is positioned at 115.1 degrees West longitude geostationary orbit point, with 72 Ka-band spot beams; 63 over the U.S. (Eastern and Western states, Alaska and Hawaii), and nine over Canada.

The Canadian beams are owned by satellite operator Telesat and are used for the Xplornet broadband service to consumers in rural Canada. The US beams provide fast Internet access called Exede, Viasat's satellite Internet service.

ViaSat-1 is part of a new satellite system architecture created by Viasat Inc. The objective is to create a better satellite broadband user experience, making satellite competitive with DSL and wireless broadband alternatives for the first time.

See also

 ViaSat-2
 ViaSat Exede Internet
 High-throughput satellite – This type of communication satellite.
 Satellite Internet access

References

External links
Exede website
NYT article
SSL ViaSat-1 page
Launch overview 
Viasat-1 footprints
System technical overview 
Design, build and launch summary video
 Xplornet Communications Inc.
 Presentation to FCC International Bureau 

Communications satellites in geostationary orbit
Satellite Internet access
High throughput satellites
Spacecraft launched in 2011
First artificial satellites of a country
Communications in the Isle of Man
2011 in the Isle of Man